is a Japanese manga series by Garon Tsuchiya and Akio Tanaka. Its chapters are serialized in the manga magazine Weekly Manga Goraku and published in tankōbon volumes by Nihon Bungeisha. As of April 2019, ten volumes have been released.

In January 2014, it was announced it would be adapted into a Japanese television drama series starring Joe Odagiri. TV Tokyo aired twelve episodes between April 19, and July 12, 2014.

Manga volumes

Drama episodes

Notes

References

External links
Manga official website 
TV drama official website 
TV Drama database 

2008 manga
2014 Japanese television series debuts
Nihon Bungeisha manga
Seinen manga
TV Tokyo original programming